Sidney Slon (May 27, 1910, in Chicago – January 21, 1995) was an American radio and television writer and actor.  In his lifetime, Slon had contributed to radio and television greatly, being the head writer of the famous radio show, The Shadow, as well as the radio show, Dick Tracy.  He acted in the radio show, "The Goldberg's", and played the doctor.  He also produced many television series that became great hits in the 1950s and 60s.

Family and early life 
Sidney's father, originally Samuel Slonimsky, had emigrated to the United States from Russia around 1885 and worked handing glasses of water to theatre going patrons for tips.  He was eight years old and this is how he learned English.  Several years later, he worked in a large furniture store in Chicago as a salesman.  The store had just installed a speaker and microphone, which to summon salesmen up to the desk.  The manager asked Samuel Slonimsky if he could change his last name because, he said, it sounded too ethnic over the loud-speaker.  Samuel complied and shortened it to Slon.  Around five years later, Sidney was born.
Sidney Slon won an award at the age of twelve for designing and flying a model airplane in a citywide civic auditorium in 1922.  The prize was a ride in a by-plane to Ohio.  This event was sponsored by a local Chicago newspaper, and a reporter was seated in the plane as well.  The plane crashed after taking off, unable to gain altitude with the extra weight.  No one died in the crash, however the pilot was knocked unconscious.  Sidney was unharmed, though shaken up.  This became front page news for the local paper.  The following week, the paper asked whether Sidney would be willing to try again; his mother, Mabel Finklestein, said no.  Sidney attended North Western University as a pre-med student around 1929, he dropped out after two years to join the Goodman Theater.  After completing the program he and another actor, Barry Kelley who starred later the movie, "Asphalt Jungle", moved to New York together, hoping to land parts on Broadway.  Unfortunately, the Great Depression was in full swing, and life in the theater business was impossible.  The two men made their way back home to Chicago despondent.

Introduction to radio 
A relatively new station had started up based in Cincinnati, Ohio, because of the strategic geographic location to hit East, South, and Mid-Western states. The powerful 500,000-watt station, WLW, was hiring actors for the emerging market of radio dramas being performed live. Slon was instantly hired because of his Goodman Theater training, he could play multiple characters with multiple accents, and was a good sight reader.  Several months into his employment at WLW, a new show was introduced, The Shadow. The producer asked Slon what he thought of the new show, a popular radio show for which Slon was the head writer. He replied, the idea was okay for radio, but he didn't like the script he had seen. The producer challenged Slon to create a better script, and so he did.  The producer loved it, and Slon became the sole writer of this new show, which became the most popular national radio show. Slon continued to act on the radio, announce shows, and write. His salary in the mid-1930s was $400 a week, enough to buy a brand new Chevrolet with.

Slon played Mr. Trent in the Valiant Lady soap opera on radio. He also had roles in Valiant Lady and Bright Horizon.

World War II 
Sidney Slon had moved to New York, and was writing for CBS and NBC radio shows in the late 1930s.  He was enlisted to work as part of the war effort for the United States Office of War Information in their broadcast division. Under the direction of John Houseman, he produced programs that were broadcast in many languages for the overseas market.  This was the very beginning of what later became 'The Voice of America'. He met Jean MacInnis, they fell in love, and were married in 1947.

Television 
After the war, he went back to work for NBC, and was executive producer for the show, "Big Town", for the advertising sponsor, 'Ruth, Roth, and Rhine'.  Television production was done in a studio, but soon production was moved to the West Coast, where large programs were shot outdoors.  Sidney's schedule became very hectic during this period, as a cross country airplane trip took 12 hours, and he was required to be back and forth between New York and LA every two weeks.  With the dissolution of the huge agency, 'Ruth, Roth, and Rhine', Sidney decided to remain in New York rather than move, as many of the writers and producers were doing at that time, to LA.  In 1961, he was the writer and producer of the ABC special, "Invitation to Paris", shot on location in France.  He wrote himself into the movie script as a befuddled American tourist, a small part in the special.

Theater producing in the 1970s 
A friend of Sidney's, Hal James, convinced him to invest in a new production called, "Man of Lamancha".  Though weary and not fully liking the sentimental nature of script, Sidney did in fact plunge in, and was rewarded handsomely as the show became a huge hit.

Family life 
Jean Slon and Sidney Slon had three children together.  Their names were, Steve Slon, who became the editor of AARP Magazine from 1998 to 2008, Jonathan Slon, a film maker, and Allison Slon, a graphic designer.  He also had daughters from a previous marriage, Shannon Simon, and Terry Heekin.  Sidney altogether had eight grandchildren, named Matt and Mathew Heekin, Jason and Jenny Simon, Shawn Slon, Sidney Charles Slon, Maeve Elizabeth Slon, and Nigel Reid Slon.  He met all of his grandchildren except for the last three, who were born after his death in 1995.

References 

1910 births
1995 deaths
Male actors from Chicago
Male actors from New York City
American male radio actors
American radio writers
Television producers from New York City
Northwestern University alumni
Writers from Chicago
Writers from New York City
20th-century American male actors
20th-century American businesspeople
Television producers from Illinois
People of the United States Office of War Information